Lepidamia kalosoma, the pinstripe cardinalfish, is a species of cardinalfish from the family, the Apogonidae, which is native to the ocean waters around Indonesia where it is found at depths down to .  This species grows to a length of  SL.

References

Apogoninae
Fish of Indonesia
Fish described in 1852